Ziya Tong is an English-born Canadian television personality and producer, formerly the co-host of Discovery Channel's long-running primetime science magazine, Daily Planet.

Early life and education
Ziya Tong was born in London, England, of Chinese and Macedonian descent, and later lived in Hong Kong. She moved from Hong Kong to Canada when she was 11.

She received her B.A. degree from the University of British Columbia in psychology and sociology. At McGill University, she graduated with an M.A. in Communications.

Career
After university, she worked as a reporter, and as a senior producer for the news-portal Orientation Global Networks in New York.

Tong began hosting the CBC Television series ZeD in the 2004–05 season, succeeding Sharon Lewis. For this, she was nominated for a Gemini Award for Viewer's Choice for Lifestyle Host in 2005.

After ZeD, Tong was hired by CTV to host the television series Island Escapes, which premiered on January 6, 2006. Critic Denise Duguay called her a "lively and game travel host".  In this position, she visited many exotic island locations, and highlighted the attractions of places such as New Caledonia, Bedarra Island and Fiji.

Starting in January 2007 she worked as a host and producer for two science shows, Wired Science on PBS and The Leading Edge, a Canadian science series on The Knowledge Network.

Tong has also written for Wired magazine and blogged on the Wired Science site for PBS. She also was a reporter for NOVA on PBS.

After joining Discovery Channel's Daily Planet as a guest host for November and December 2008, she was named the new permanent co-host of the daily science program.

For three years, Tong co-hosted Daily Planet with science journalist Jay Ingram. When Ingram retired from the program in June 2011, Tong was joined by co-host Dan Riskin and since, the show has generated record ratings as it completed its 18th season on Canadian television.  Tong also writes and produces Ziyology, a weekly column looking at wonder and science.

She appears regularly on Canada AM, CTV News Channel, CP24 and CTV National News.

Tong has travelled to more than 60 countries. She is fluent in English and Cantonese, she is working on her French, Mandarin and Arabic.

She serves on the board of directors of the World Wide Fund for Nature (WWF) Canada.

Her non-fiction book The Reality Bubble was published by Penguin Random House in May 2019. The book was nominated for the 2020 RCC Charles Taylor Prize

She defended Max Eisen's memoir By Chance Alone in the 2019 edition of Canada Reads. The book won the competition.

Career timeline
 2004–2005: ZeD host
 2006: "Island Escape" host
 2007: "Leading Edge" host, Wired Science host and producer
 2008-9: NOVA reporter, co-host
 2008–2018: Daily Planet co-host

References

External links
 Ziya Tong's Official Website
 

1980 births
Living people
English emigrants to Canada
English emigrants to Hong Kong
English people of Chinese descent
British people of Macedonian descent
Canadian bloggers
Canadian people of Chinese descent
Canadian people of Macedonian descent
Canadian television reporters and correspondents
Canadian television hosts
Canadian television producers
Canadian women television producers
Journalists from London
Journalists from Toronto
Hong Kong emigrants to Canada
McGill University alumni
Naturalized citizens of Canada
Writers from London
Writers from Toronto
University of British Columbia alumni
Canadian women bloggers
Canadian women television journalists
Canadian women non-fiction writers
Canadian science writers
Canadian women television hosts
21st-century Canadian non-fiction writers
21st-century Canadian women writers